Lieutenant-Colonel Sir William Abraham Edward Wayland (1 September 1869 – 15 July 1950) was an English Conservative Party politician and farmer. He sat in the House of Commons from 1927 to 1945.

Wayland was educated at Marlowes College. He served as Mayor of Deptford from 1914 to 1920, for which he was knighted in the 1920 New Year Honours. He was elected as the Member of Parliament (MP) for Canterbury at a by-election in November 1927, holding the seat until he retired in 1945 because of a wish expressed by party leaders that no candidate should be aged over 70.

In 1931, the Conservative whip was withdrawn from him when he supported Sir Ernest Petter, standing as an Independent Conservative against the official Conservative candidate, in the Westminster St George's by-election, but it was restored before the general election later that year.

Wayland served as chairman of the Empire Day Movement from 1927 to 1948.

Footnotes

References
Obituary, The Times, 17 July 1950

External links 
 
 "Sir William Wayland to Introduce Bill" - The Glasgow Herald
 "British Empire's Reply to Russian Five-Year Plan" - Ottawa Citizen

1869 births
1950 deaths
Mayors of places in Greater London
Knights Bachelor
Conservative Party (UK) MPs for English constituencies
UK MPs 1924–1929
UK MPs 1929–1931
UK MPs 1931–1935
UK MPs 1935–1945
English farmers
British Army officers
Politics of Canterbury
Members of Deptford Metropolitan Borough Council